Gregg Herken is an American historian and museum curator who is Professor Emeritus of modern American diplomatic History at the University of California, Merced, whose scholarship mostly concerns the history of the development of atomic energy and the Cold War.

Biography
In 1969, Herken received a B.A. from University of California, Santa Cruz.  In 1974, he received a Ph.D. in  modern American diplomatic history from Princeton University.

Herken held teaching positions at California State University, San Luis Obispo, Oberlin College, Yale University, and California Institute of Technology, and was a Fulbright-Hays senior research scholar at Lund University.  During 1988–2003 he was senior historian and curator at the Smithsonian Institution's National Air and Space Museum in Washington, D.C. He also served on the U.S. government's Advisory Committee on Human Radiation Experiments during 1994–95.

Graduate Students 
Herken has served as a dissertation advisor to several students, including Richard Ravalli, Trevor Albertson, and served on the dissertation committee for Tami Davis-Biddle.

Works
In 2003, Herken's book Brotherhood of the Bomb, for which he received a MacArthur Grant to write, was a finalist for the Los Angeles Times Book Prize in history.

References

External links
 Smithsonian Air and Space Wall of Honor page

21st-century American historians
21st-century American male writers
20th-century American historians
American male non-fiction writers
University of California, Merced faculty
Princeton University alumni
University of California, Santa Cruz alumni
American curators
Smithsonian Institution people
MacArthur Fellows
Living people
Place of birth missing (living people)
Date of birth missing (living people)
Historians of nuclear weapons
Year of birth missing (living people)
Historians from California
20th-century American male writers